Kadeem Hardison (born July 24, 1965) is an American actor. The son of fashion model Bethann Hardison, he rose to prominence after landing the role of Dwayne Wayne on the television series A Different World, a spin-off of the long-running NBC sitcom The Cosby Show. He is also known for playing Craig Cooper, the title character's father, in the Disney Channel series K.C. Undercover. Hardison has also appeared in the first season of the Showtime comedy Black Monday and starred as Bowser in the Netflix series Teenage Bounty Hunters.

Early life
Hardison was born in Bedford–Stuyvesant, Brooklyn, New York, the only child of Donald McFadden, an antique and fine art collector, and Bethann Hardison, a pioneering African-American runway model and advocate for diversity in the fashion industry.

Career
Hardison was a starring cast member on the sitcom A Different World as Dwayne Wayne, and a regular cast member of K.C. Undercover and the short-lived sitcoms Abby and Between Brothers. His career was managed predominantly by his mother, Bethann Hardison. He has also guest starred on several other sitcoms, including Living Single, Girlfriends, Under One Roof, The Boondocks (as himself), Greek, Parenthood, and on Everybody Hates Chris as the judge. His films include Escapee, Rappin', School Daze, Def by Temptation, Vampire in Brooklyn, 30 Years to Life, Made of Honor, The 6th Man, Drive, Renaissance Man, Panther, The Fantasia Barrino Story: Life Is Not a Fairy Tale, Bratz, Biker Boyz, Who's Your Daddy?, The Crow: Stairway to Heaven, I'm Gonna Git You Sucka, Blind Faith, Showtime, White Men Can't Jump, and B.C. Butcher. He appears as an actor in the 2013 PlayStation 3 exclusive video game Beyond: Two Souls as Cole Freeman.

Personal life
Hardison was married to American singer Chanté Moore from 1997 until 2000; they have a daughter named Sophia (b. 1996). Hardison remains a close friend of actor Darryl Bell, who played his best friend Ron Johnson on A Different World; he made an appearance alongside Bell on FOX's Househusbands of Hollywood.

Filmography

Film

Television
{| class="wikitable"
! Year
! Title
! Role
! Notes
|-
| 1981
| ABC Afterschool Specials
| 
| Episode: "The Colour of Friendship"
|-
| 1984
| The Cosby Show
| Phillip Washington
| Episode: "A Shirt Story"
|-
| 1985
| American Playhouse
| Royal
| Episode: "Go Tell It on the Mountain"
|-
| 1987-93
| A Different World
| Dwayne Cleophus Wayne
| Main role
|-
| 1987
| Spenser: For Hire| Bobby Waters
| Episode: "My Enemy, My Friend"
|-
| 1990
| Saturday Morning Videos| Himself/host
|
|-
| 1990-1991
| Sesame Street
| Himself
| 2 episodes
|-
|rowspan=3| 1992
| CBS Schoolbreak Special| Henry Brooks
| Episode: "Words Up!"
|-
| Out All Night| Dean
| Episode: "Smooth Operator"
|-
| Roc| Rev. Adams
| Episode: "Dear Landlord"
|-
| 1994
| Captain Planet and the Planeteers| Goki
| Voice; episode: "Gorillas Will Be Missed"
|-
| 1995
| Living Single| Marcus Hughes
| Episode: "Who's Scooping Who?"
|-
| 1997
| Touched by an Angel| Marc Hamilton
| Episode: "Smokescreen"
|-
| 1997
| Fox After Breakfast| Himself 
|
|-
| 1998
| Love Boat: The Next Wave| Perry
| Episode: "Smooth Sailing"
|-
| 1998
| Linc's| 
| Episode: "Gangsta Rap"
|-
| 1998
| Fantasy Island| Michael Wilkinson
| Episode: "Wishboned"
|-
| 1998–1999
| The Crow: Stairway to Heaven| Skull Cowboy
| Guest: 2 episodes
|-
| 1997–1999
| Between Brothers| Charles Gordon
| Main: 17 episodes (seasons 1 and 2)
|-
| 2000
| Just Shoot Me!| Tad Gallow
| Episode: "Blackjack"
|-
| 2000
| Happily Ever After: Fairy Tales for Every Child| Clown
| Voice; episode: "The Steadfast Tin Soldier"
|-
| 2002–2003
| Livin' Large| Host
| Unknown episodes
|-
| 2003
| Abby| Will Jefferies
| Main: 10 episodes (1 Season)
|-
| 2000–2004
| [[Static Shock#Characters|Static Shock]]
| Adam Evans/Rubberband Man
| Voice; 7 episodes
|-
| 2005
| One on One
| Director
| Episode: "Venice Boulevard of Broken Dreams"
|-
| 2006
| Just for Kicks
| Charles Atwood
| Recurring: 3 episodes
|-
| 2006
| My Name is Earl
| Owner
| Episode: "Born a Gamblin Man"
|-
| 2006–2007
| House
| Lawyer Howard Gemeiner
| Guest: 2 episodes
|-
| 2007
| Girlfriends
| Eldon Parks
| Guest: 3 episodes
|-
| 2008
| Under One Roof
| Jamal
| Episode: "Cell Out"
|-
| 2007–2009
| Everybody Hates Chris
| Judge Harry Watkins
| Guest: 2 episodes
|-
| 2009
| Greek
| Brian Howard
| Episode: "Our Fathers"
|-
| 2009
| Cold Case
| Andrew 'Huxtable' Garrett '09
| Episode: "Read Between the Lines"
|-
| 2010
| Ghost Whisperer
| Dean Olson
| Episode: "Dead Air"
|-
| 2012
| Parenthood
| Richard Gilchrist
| Episode: "Remember Me, I'm the One Who Loves You"
|-
| 2012
| Family Guy
| Unknown
| Voice; episode: "Ratings Guy"
|-
| 2013
| Cult
| Paz
| Recurring: 8 episodes
|-
| 2015–2018
| K.C. Undercover
| Craig Cooper
| Main cast
|-
| 2016
| Supernatural
| Russell Lemmons
| Episode: "Rock Never Dies"
|-
| 2018
| Love Is
| Norman
| Season 1
|-
| 2019
| Black Monday
| Spencer
| Recurring role: 7 episodes
|-
| 2020
| Teenage Bounty Hunters
| Bowser Simmons
| Main role
|-
| 2022
| Grown-ish
| Carnegie
| Episode: "The Revolution Will Not Be Televised"
|-
| 2022
| The Lincoln Lawyer
| Detective Kinder
| 2 episodes
|-
| 2022
| Moonhaven
| Arlo
|
|}

Video games

Cultural influence
Linda Rosenkrantz and Pamela Redmond Satran credit Hardison for making the name "Kadeem" familiar.
Hardison is the model for the title character Michael “The Cool” Young History in the inserts of the album The Cool by Lupe Fiasco.
Hardison was the subject of then-wife Chanté Moore's 1999 single "Chanté's Got a Man".
In a press conference following Game 4 of the 2012 NBA Finals, Dwyane Wade wore flip-up sunglasses and said he was, "paying a little homage to Dwayne Wayne tonight", referencing Hardison's popular character from A Different World.
In Season 2, Episode 7 of Psych ("If You're So Smart, Then Why Are You Dead"), Gus references utilizing the "Kadeem Hardison method" to kiss a girl.
Hardison appears as the narrator on Add-2's 2019 album, Jim Crow: The Musical.

References

External links

1965 births
20th-century American male actors
21st-century American male actors
American male film actors
African-American male actors
American male television actors
Living people
Male actors from New York City
American male voice actors
American male video game actors
People from Bedford–Stuyvesant, Brooklyn
20th-century African-American people
21st-century African-American people